The Vienna Convention on the Law of Treaties (VCLT) is an international agreement regulating treaties between states. Known as the "treaty on treaties", it establishes comprehensive rules, procedures, and guidelines for how treaties are defined, drafted, amended, interpreted, and generally operated. An international treaty is a written agreement between international law subjects reflecting their consent to the creation, alteration, or termination of their rights and obligations. The VCLT is considered a codification of customary international law and state practice concerning treaties.

The convention was adopted and opened to signature on 23 May 1969, and it entered into force on 27 January 1980. It has been ratified by 116 states as of January 2018. Some non-ratifying parties, such as the United States, have recognized parts of it as a restatement of customary international law.

The VCLT is regarded as one of the most important instruments in treaty law and remains an authoritative guide in disputes over treaty interpretation.

History
The VCLT was drafted by the International Law Commission (ILC) of the United Nations, which began work on the convention in 1949. During the 20 years of preparation, several draft versions of the convention and commentaries were prepared by special rapporteurs of the ILC, which included prominent international law scholars James Brierly, Hersch Lauterpacht, Gerald Fitzmaurice, and Humphrey Waldock.

In 1966, the ILC adopted 75 draft articles, which formed the basis for its final work. Over two sessions in 1968 and 1969, the Vienna Conference completed the convention, which was adopted on 22 May 1969 and opened for signature on the following day.

Content and effects
The convention codifies several bedrocks of contemporary international law.  It defines a treaty as "an international agreement concluded between states in written form and governed by international law" and affirms that "every state possesses the capacity to conclude treaties." Article 1 restricts the application of the convention to written treaties between States, excluding treaties concluded between the states and international organizations or international organizations themselves. Article 26 defines pacta sunt servanda, Article 53 proclaims peremptory norm, and Article 62 proclaims Fundamental Change of Circumstance.

The convention has been referred to as the "treaty on treaties" and is widely recognized as the authoritative guide regarding the formation and effects of treaties. Even those countries who have not ratified it recognize its significance. For example, the United States recognizes that parts of the Convention constitute customary law binding on all states. The Supreme Court of India has also recognised the customary status of the convention.

Scope
The Convention applies only to treaties that came after it was made and to those concluded between states and so does not govern agreements between states and international organizations or between international organizations themselves, but if any of its rules are independently binding on such organizations, they remain so. The VCLT applies to treaties between states within an intergovernmental organization.

However, agreements between states and international organizations or between international organizations themselves are governed by the 1986 Vienna Convention on the Law of Treaties between States and International Organizations or Between International Organizations if it enters into force. Furthermore, in treaties between states and international organizations, the terms of the Convention still apply between the state members. The Convention does not apply to unwritten agreements.

Parties to the convention

As of January 2018, there are 116 state parties that have ratified the convention, and a further 15 states have signed but have not ratified the convention. In addition, the Republic of China (Taiwan), which is currently recognized by only , signed the Convention in 1970 prior to the UN General Assembly's 1971 vote to transfer China's seat to the People's Republic of China, which subsequently acceded to the convention. There are 66 UN member states that have neither signed nor ratified the convention.

Vienna formula

Signature, ratification and accession 
International treaties and conventions contain rules about what entities could sign, ratify or accede to them. Some treaties are restricted to states that are members of the UN or parties to the Statute of the International Court of Justice. In rare cases, there is an explicit list of the entities that the treaty is restricted to. More commonly, the aim of the negotiating states (most or all of which usually end up becoming the founding signatories) is that the treaty is not restricted to particular states and so a wording like "this treaty is open for signature to States willing to accept its provisions" is used (the "all states formula").

In the case of regional organisations, such as the Council of Europe or the Organization of American States, the set of negotiating states that once agreed upon may sign and ratify the treaty is usually limited to its own member states, and non-member states may accede to it later. However, sometimes a specific set of non-member states or non-state actors may be invited to join negotiations. For example, the Council of Europe invited the "non-member States" Canada, the Holy See (Vatican City), Japan, Mexico and the United States to "participate in the elaboration" of the 2011 Istanbul Convention and specifically allowed the European Union (described as an "International Organisation," rather than a "State") to sign and ratify the convention, rather than accede to it, and "other non-member States" were allowed only accession.

The act of signing and ratifying a treaty as a negotiating state has the same effect as the act of acceding to a treaty (or "acceding a treaty") by a state that was not involved in its negotiation. Usually, accessions occur only after the treaty has entered into force, but the UN Secretary General has occasionally accepted accessions even before a treaty went into force. The only downside of not being a negotiating state is that one has no influence over the contents of a treaty, but one is still allowed to declare reservations with respect to specific provisions of the treaty that one wishes to accede to (Article 19).

Statehood question 
When a treaty is open to "States", it may be difficult or impossible for the depositary authority to determine which entities are States. If the treaty is restricted to Members of the United Nations or Parties to the Statute of the International Court of Justice, there is no ambiguity. However, a difficulty has occurred as to possible participation in treaties when entities that appeared otherwise to be States could not be admitted to the United Nations or become Parties to the Statute of the International Court of Justice because of the opposition for political reasons of a permanent member of the Security Council or have not applied for ICJ or UN membership. Since that difficulty did not arise as concerns membership in the specialized agencies, on which there is no "veto" procedure, a number of those States became members of specialized agencies and so were in essence recognized as States by the international community. Accordingly, to allow for as wide a participation as possible, a number of conventions then provided that they were also open for participation to States members of specialized agencies. The type of entry-into-force clause used in the Vienna Convention on the Law of Treaties was later called the "Vienna formula," and its wording was used by various treaties, conventions and organizations.

Some treaties that use it include provisions that in addition to these States any other State invited by a specified authority or organization (commonly the United Nations General Assembly or an institution created by the treaty in question) can also participate, thus making the scope of potential signatories even broader.

Interpretation of treaties
Articles 31-33 of the VCLT entail principles for interpreting conventions, treaties etc. These principles are recognized as representing customary international law, for example by the International Law Commission (ILC).

The interpretational principles codified in Article 31 are to be used before applying those of Article 32, which explicitly states that it offers supplementary means of interpretation.

The European Court of Justice has also applied the interpretational provisions of the VCLT in different cases, including the Bosphorus Queen Case (2018), in which the court interpreted the extent of the term "any resources" in Article 220(6) of UNCLOS.

The VCLT is often relied upon in investment arbitration cases.

See also
 United Nations General Assembly Resolution 97 (1) (1946)
 Vienna Convention on Diplomatic Relations (1961)
 Vienna Convention on Consular Relations (1963)
 Vienna Convention on Succession of States in respect of Treaties (1978)
 List of Vienna conventions
 Provisional application (treaty)

Footnotes

External links 

 Convention Text
 Introductory note by Karl Zemanek, procedural history note and audiovisual material on the Vienna Convention on the Law of Treaties in the Historic Archives of the United Nations Audiovisual Library of International Law
 Lectures by Annebeth Rosenboom entitled Practical Aspects of Treaty Law: The Depositary Functions of the Secretary-General and Practical Aspects of Treaty Law: Treaty Registration under Article 102 of the Charter of the United Nations (both lectures also available in French) in the Lecture Series of the United Nations Audiovisual Library of International Law

Treaties concluded in 1969
Treaties entered into force in 1980
Treaties drafted by the International Law Commission
United Nations treaties
Treaties of Albania
Treaties of Algeria
Treaties of Andorra
Treaties of Argentina
Treaties of Armenia
Treaties of Australia
Treaties of Austria
Treaties of Barbados
Treaties of the Byelorussian Soviet Socialist Republic
Treaties of Belgium
Treaties of Bosnia and Herzegovina
Treaties of Brazil
Treaties of the People's Republic of Bulgaria
Treaties of Burkina Faso
Treaties of Cameroon
Treaties of Canada
Treaties of the Central African Republic
Treaties of Chile
Treaties of the People's Republic of China
Treaties of Colombia
Treaties of the Republic of the Congo
Treaties of Costa Rica
Treaties of Croatia
Treaties of Cuba
Treaties of Cyprus
Treaties of the Czech Republic
Treaties of Czechoslovakia
Treaties of Zaire
Treaties of Denmark
Treaties of the Dominican Republic
Treaties of Ecuador
Treaties of Egypt
Treaties of Estonia
Treaties of Finland
Treaties of Gabon
Treaties of Georgia (country)
Treaties of West Germany
Treaties of East Germany
Treaties of the Kingdom of Greece
Treaties of Guatemala
Treaties of Guinea
Treaties of Guyana
Treaties of Haiti
Treaties of the Holy See
Treaties of Honduras
Treaties of the Hungarian People's Republic
Treaties of Ireland
Treaties of Italy
Treaties of Jamaica
Treaties of Japan
Treaties of Kazakhstan
Treaties of Kiribati
Treaties of Kuwait
Treaties of Kyrgyzstan
Treaties of Laos
Treaties of Latvia
Treaties of Lesotho
Treaties of Liberia
Treaties of the Libyan Arab Jamahiriya
Treaties of Liechtenstein
Treaties of Lithuania
Treaties of Luxembourg
Treaties of Malawi
Treaties of Malaysia
Treaties of the Maldives
Treaties of Mali
Treaties of Malta
Treaties of Mauritius
Treaties of Mexico
Treaties of the Mongolian People's Republic
Treaties of Montenegro
Treaties of Morocco
Treaties of Mozambique
Treaties of Myanmar
Treaties of Nauru
Treaties of the Netherlands
Treaties of New Zealand
Treaties of Niger
Treaties of Nigeria
Treaties of Oman
Treaties of the State of Palestine
Treaties of Panama
Treaties of Paraguay
Treaties of Peru
Treaties of the Philippines
Treaties of Poland
Treaties of Portugal
Treaties of South Korea
Treaties of Moldova
Treaties of the Soviet Union
Treaties of Rwanda
Treaties of Saudi Arabia
Treaties of Senegal
Treaties of Serbia and Montenegro
Treaties of Slovakia
Treaties of Slovenia
Treaties of the Solomon Islands
Treaties of Francoist Spain
Treaties of Saint Vincent and the Grenadines
Treaties of the Republic of the Sudan (1985–2011)
Treaties of Suriname
Treaties of Sweden
Treaties of Switzerland
Treaties of Syria
Treaties of Tajikistan
Treaties of North Macedonia
Treaties of East Timor
Treaties of Togo
Treaties of Tunisia
Treaties of Turkmenistan
Treaties of the Ukrainian Soviet Socialist Republic
Treaties of the United Kingdom
Treaties of Tanzania
Treaties of Ukraine
Treaties of Uruguay
Treaties of Uzbekistan
Treaties of Vietnam
Treaties of Yugoslavia
1969 in Austria
Treaty law treaties
Treaties extended to the Faroe Islands
Treaties extended to Greenland
Treaties extended to the Netherlands Antilles
Treaties extended to Aruba
Treaties extended to West Berlin
May 1969 events
1960s in Vienna